Georg Funkquist (13 March 1900 – 23 October 1986) was a Swedish film actor. He was born in Uppsala, Sweden and died in Stockholm.

Selected filmography

 The Red Day (1931)
 Poor Millionaires (1936)
 Mother Gets Married (1937)
 Happy Vestköping (1937)
 Adolf Saves the Day (1938)
 Kalle's Inn (1939)
 We at Solglantan (1939)
 Her Melody (1940)
 The Bjorck Family (1940)
Home from Babylon (1941)
 Poor Ferdinand (1941)
 Little Napoleon (1943)
 Imprisoned Women (1943)
 There's a Fire Burning (1943)
 We Need Each Other (1944)
 Appassionata (1944)
 Crime and Punishment (1945)
 Affairs of a Model (1946)
 Sunshine (1948)
 Kvinnan bakom allt (1951)
 Summer Interlude (1951)
 Dance in the Smoke (1954)
 The Staffan Stolle Story (1956)
 The Stranger from the Sky (1956)
 Woman in a Fur Coat (1958)
 The Jazz Boy (1958)
 The Devil's Eye (1960)
 All These Women (1964)

References

External links

1900 births
1986 deaths
People from Uppsala
20th-century Swedish male actors